¡Policia!: A Tribute to the Police is a tribute album released by The Militia Group in 2005. The album consisted of contemporary artists performing cover versions of songs by The Police.

Track listing
All songs were written by Sting except "Murder by Numbers", which was written by Sting and Andy Summers.

References

2005 compilation albums
The Police tribute albums
Rock compilation albums
The Militia Group compilation albums